Herminie Templeton Kavanagh (1861 – 30 October 1933) was an Irish writer, most known for her short stories.

She was born Herminie McGibney, the daughter of Major George McGibney, of Longford, Ireland. She became Herminie Templeton after her marriage to John Templeton, and Herminie Templeton Kavanagh after her second marriage, to Marcus Kavanagh (1859–1937), who served as a Cook County judge in Chicago from 1898 to 1935.

Accounts differ on how she and Judge Kavanagh met, and where and when they married. In July 1908, the Chicago Tribune announced that they would be married at his parents' church in Des Moines, Iowa, but that the judge was "reticent as to the details." Another article in the Tribune, several weeks later, said that Mrs. Templeton had been abandoned by her first husband in Chicago circa 1893. In the course of the clerical work in the city recorder's office by which she supported herself, she met Kavanagh, and they were to be married at the church in County Waterford, Ireland where his parents had been married. "It is said there has been a silent understanding and a wait of over ten years" until news of Templeton's death in 1907, the article explained. But the following day, the Tribune reported that they were married in Dublin, Ireland on 19 August 1908, by a monsignor from Des Moines, Iowa.

But according to her 1933 obituary in the same newspaper, they met in Ireland in 1907 while the judge was touring Europe and she was gathering material for a book, and they married on 19 August 1908, at his parents' church in Des Moines. Judge Kavanagh's listing in Who Was Who in America (1943) said that they were married on 19 August 1905.

Her best known work, Darby O'Gill and the Good People, was first published as a series of stories under the name Herminie Templeton in McClure's magazine in 1901–1902, before being published as a book in the United States in 1903. A second edition, published a year before her death, was under the name Herminie T. Kavanagh.

The Good People in the title refers to the fairies in Irish mythology. The English translation of daoine maithe is good people.

Her second published book, Ashes of Old Wishes and Other Darby O'Gill Tales, was published in 1926. In 1959, Walt Disney released a film based on these two books, called Darby O'Gill and the Little People.

She also wrote two plays, The Color Sergeant (1903), and Swift-Wing of the Cherokee (1903).

Judge and Mrs. Kavanagh lived in Chicago and Ocean Grove, New Jersey. She died of a heart ailment, and was buried in New York, her former home.

References

Further reading
 American Women Playwrights, 1900–1930. A checklist. Compiled by Frances Diodato Bzowski. Westport, Connecticut: Greenwood Press, 1992.
 Science Fiction and Fantasy Literature. A checklist, 1700–1974. Volume 1. By R. Reginald. Detroit: Gale Research, 1979.

External links

 
 
 An article about Mrs. Kavanagh's books, with some biographical information broken link
 

1861 births
1933 deaths
English expatriates in the United States
English people of Irish descent
English short story writers
Writers from Aldershot